Maximalist film or maximalist cinema is related to the art and philosophy of maximalism, a reaction against minimalism.

Notable filmmakers

This type of film includes the likes of directors: 

Bill Gunn 
Tyler Perry 
Spike Lee
Wong Kar-wai
Wes Anderson
Jane Campion
David Lynch 
Michael Bay 
Zack Snyder 
Julie Taymor 
Sofia Coppola 
Tony Scott 
Paul W. S. Anderson 
Terry Gilliam 
Paul Verhoeven 
Federico Fellini 
Pedro Almodovar 
Edgar Wright 
Sam Raimi 
King Vidor 
Oliver Stone 
Steven Spielberg 
Alejandro G. Inarritu 
Quentin Tarantino 
S. S. Rajamouli 
Josef von Sternberg 
Max Ophüls 
Orson Welles 
Rainer Werner Fassbinder 
Tim Burton 
The team of Michael Powell and Emeric Pressburger 
John Woo 
Genndy Tartakovsky (Hotel Transylvania) 
Masaaki Yuasa 
Xavier Dolan 
Paul Thomas Anderson 
Baz Luhrmann 
Danny Boyle
Guy Ritchie 
James Cameron 
Joachim Trier
Park Chan-wook

List of notable maximalist films

Intolerance (D.W. Griffith, 1916)
Metropolis (Fritz Lang, 1927)
Napoleon (Abel Gance, 1927)
Fantasia (James Algar, 1940)
The Greatest Show on Earth (Cecil B. DeMille, 1952)
Singin' in the Rain (Gene Kelly and Stanley Donen, 1952)
Lola Montes (Max Ophuls, 1955)
Artists & Models (Frank Tashlin, 1956)
The Flicker (Tony Conrad, 1965)
Daisies (Vera Chytilova, 1966)
War and Peace (Sergei Bondarchuk, 1966)
Point Blank (John Boorman, 1967)
Weekend (Jean-Luc Goddard, 1967)
Fellini Satyricon (Federico Fellini, 1969)
Z (Costa-Gavras, 1969)
Salomè (Carmelo Bene, 1972)
The Holy Mountain (Alejandro Jodorowsky, 1973)
Zardoz (John Boorman, 1974)
New York, New York (Martin Scorsese, 1977)
Sorcerer (William Friedkin, 1977)
Piranha (Joe Dante, 1978)
The Blues Brothers (John Landis, 1980)
Xanadu (Robert Greenwald, 1980)
The Apple (Menahem Golan, 1980)
American Pop (Ralph Bakshi, 1981)
Escape from New York (John Carpenter, 1981)
Excalibur (John Boorman, 1981)
Amadeus (Miloš Forman, 1984)
The Color Purple (Steven Spielberg, 1985)
Brazil (Terry Gilliam, 1985)
On the Silver Globe (Andrzej Żuławski, 1988)
Total Recall (Paul Verhoeven, 1990)
Prospero's Books (Peter Greenaway, 1991)
Bram Stoker's Dracula (Francis Ford Coppola, 1992)
Casino (Martin Scorsese, 1995)
To Wong Foo, Thanks for Everything! Julie Newmar (Beeban Kidron, 1995)
Waterworld (Kevin Reynolds, 1995)
Seven Servants (Daryush Shokof, 1996)
Titanic (James Cameron, 1997)
Armageddon (Michael Bay, 1998)
Titus (Julie Taymor, 1999)
Bamboozled (Spike Lee, 2000)
Charlie's Angels (McG, 2000)
Moulin Rogue (Baz Luhrmann, 2001)
The Matrix Reloaded (The Wachowskis, 2003)
The Matrix Revolutions (The Wachowskis, 2003)
Man on Fire (Tony Scott, 2004)
The Polar Express (Robert Zemeckis, 2004)
Speed Racer (The Wachowskis, 2008)
A Town Called Panic (Stéphane Aubier and Vincent Patar, 2009)
Avatar (James Cameron, 2009)
The Imaginarium of Dr. Parnassus, (Terry Gilliam, 2009)
The Adventures of Tintin (Steven Spielberg, 2011)
Transformers: Dark of the Moon (Michael Bay, 2011)
The Great Gatsby (Baz Luhrmann, 2013)
Hard to Be a God (Aleksei German, 2013)
Blue Is the Warmest Color (Abdellatif Kechiche, 2014)
Mommy (Xavier Dolan, 2014)
Birdman or (The Unexpected Virtue of Ignorance) (Alejandro G. Inarritu, 2014)
De Palma (Noah Baumbach and Jake Paltrow, 2015)
Mad Max: Fury Road (George Miller, 2015)
Dunkirk (Christopher Nolan, 2017)
Mother! (Darren Aronofsky, 2017)
American Made (Doug Liman, 2017)
I, Tonya (Craig Gillespie, 2017)
Spider-Man: Into the Spider-Verse (Bob Persichetti, Peter Ramsey & Rodney Rothman, 2018)
Suspiria (Luca Guadagnino, 2018)
Fahrenheit 11/9 (Michael Moore, 2018)
The Lighthouse (Robert Eggers, 2019)
The Croods: A New Age (Joel Crawford, 2020)
Da 5 Bloods (Spike Lee, 2020)
Tenet (Christopher Nolan, 2020)
Army of the Dead (Zack Snyder, 2021)
Belle (Mamoru Hosoda, 2021)
Encanto (Byron Howard and Jared Bush, 2021)
House of Gucci (Ridley Scott, 2021)
In the Heights (Jon M. Chu, 2021)
Jungle Cruise (Jaume Collet-Serra, 2021)
The Last Duel (Ridley Scott, 2021)
The Mitchells vs. the Machines (Mike Rianda, 2021)
Babylon (Damien Chazelle, 2022)
Blonde (Andrew Dominik, 2022)
Elvis (Baz Luhrmann, 2022)
Everything Everywhere All at Once (Daniels, 2022)
Moonage Daydream (Brett Morgen, 2022)
RRR (S. S. Rajamouli, 2022)
Top Gun: Maverick (Joseph Kosinski, 2022)
The Unbearable Weight of Massive Talent (Tom Gormican, 2022)
White Noise (Noah Baumbach, 2022)
Sources:

See also
 Arthouse animation
 Vulgar auteurism
 Postmodernist film
 Minimalist film
 Art film
 Arthouse action film
 Modernist film
 Arthouse musical

References

External links
Minimalism and Maximalism: The 42nd New York Film Festival - Senses of Cinema

Postmodern art
1920s in film
1950s in film
1960s in film
1970s in film
1980s in film
1990s in film
2000s in film
2010s in film
2020s in film
Film genres
Modern art
2000s in animation
2010s in animation
2020s in animation